Joe Rees may refer to:

 Joe Rees (rugby union, born 1893), Welsh international rugby union player 
 Joe Rees (rugby union, born 1990), Welsh rugby union player